Malene Krølbøll Hansen (born 1995) is a Danish professional golfer who plays on the Symetra Tour.

Amateur career
Krølbøll played for the National Team and represented Denmark in two European Girls' Team Championships and six European Ladies' Team Championships between 2011 and 2018, with best result a bronze medal in 2012. She finished 4th at the 2016 Espirito Santo Trophy and 8th at the 2018 Espirito Santo Trophy.

In 2013, she won the Annika Invitational Europe and played in the Ladies European Tour event the Helsingborg Open in Sweden, and made the cut.

Krølbøll was a member of the Coastal Carolina women's golf program from 2014-18. Krølbøll was a two-time All-Big South selection, and after the school's move to the Sun Belt Conference, she received two All-Sun Belt honors along with being named the Sun Belt Conference Player of the Year in both 2017 and 2018. She won four individual titles including the 2018 Sun Belt Championship. Krølbøll had the greatest women's golf career in school history, and earned a degree in marketing.

In June 2018, Krølbøll played two tournaments on the Swedish Golf Tour. She lost a playoff at the Hinton Golf Open to Anna Magnusson, but the following week won the Skaftö Open, 4 strokes ahead of Filippa Möörk.

Professional career
Krølbøll turned professional in September 2018 and joined the 2019 Symetra Tour. In her rookie season, she made ten cuts in 18 events, and finished 84th in the ranking after a season best T8 at the Four Winds Invitational. 

In a pandemic-reduced 2020 season, she made every cut in eight starts, and finished 27th in the ranking. She recorded two top-10 finishes including a season-best T9 result at the Symetra Tour Championship.

Amateur wins
2011 Norberg Open
2012 Norberg Open, Junior Masters Invitational, Vejlematchen
2013 Norberg Open, Nordea Furesopokalen, Annika Invitational Europe
2014 Wiibroe Cup, Schyberg Junior Open
2015 DGU Elite Tour III
2016 Wiibroe Cup, Golfweek Conference Challenge, Danish International Ladies Amateur Championship
2017 Wiibroe Cup, Ladies Fall Intercollegiate
2018 Charleston Invitational, Sun Belt Conference Tournament, Danish International Ladies Amateur Championship

Source:

Professional wins (1)

Swedish Golf Tour wins (1)

Team appearances
Amateur
European Girls' Team Championship (representing Denmark): 2011, 2012
European Ladies' Team Championship (representing Denmark): 2013, 2014, 2015, 2016, 2017, 2018
Espirito Santo Trophy (representing Denmark): 2016, 2018

References

External links

Malene Krølbøll Hansen at the Coastal Carolina Chanticleer official site

Danish female golfers
Coastal Carolina Chanticleers women's golfers
Sportspeople from Copenhagen
1995 births
Living people